Wairuna is a rural locality in the Tablelands Region, Queensland, Australia. In the  Wairuna had a population of 0 people.

Geography
The entire locality is a protected area. Most of it is within the Girringun National Park, except for the western corner of the locality which is in the Girringun Conservation Park and two small areas in the west and north-west of the locality which are in the Girringun Resources Reserve.

History
In the  Wairuna had a population of 0 people.

Heritage listings
Wairuna has a number of heritage-listed sites, including:
 Wairuna Road: Wairuna Homestead

References

Tablelands Region
Localities in Queensland